The 1994 DFB-Supercup, known as the Panasonic DFB-Supercup for sponsorship purposes, was the eighth DFB-Supercup, an annual football match contested by the winners of the previous season's Bundesliga and DFB-Pokal competitions.

The match was played at the Olympiastadion, Munich, and contested by league champions Bayern Munich and cup winners Werder Bremen.

Teams

Match

Details

See also
 1993–94 Bundesliga
 1993–94 DFB-Pokal

References

1994
FC Bayern Munich matches
SV Werder Bremen matches
1994–95 in German football cups